Ngongo may mean:

"Ngongo", nickname of Angolan government official Roberto Leal Monteiro
Ngongo (language), a dialect of the Congolese language Nkutu
Ngongo, a stringed instrument from the Akele people